The 6th constituency of Saône-et-Loire was a French legislative constituency in the Saône-et-Loire département.

Following the 2009 redistricting, the constituency was abolished; its borders, however, are nearly coterminous with the redrawn 4th constituency.

Deputies

Election results

1997

2002

2007

Sources
 Official results of 1997 French legislative election: 
 Official results of French elections from 1998: 

Defunct French legislative constituencies